The Maidenhall Estate is a council estate in Ipswich, in the Ipswich district, in the county of Suffolk, England. In 1975 the remains of a mammoth were excavated at Stoke High School, some of the bones of which are on display at Ipswich Museum.

Amenities
Maidenhall has the Hillside Primary School, Stoke High School, Stoke Green Baptist Church and a sports centre.

References
 Philip's Street Atlas Suffolk (page 139)

Housing estates in England
Ipswich Districts